Il merlo maschio (The Male Blackbird), known in the United Kingdom as The Naked Cello or Secret Fantasy in the United States, is an Italian film in the commedia sexy all'italiana style, and presents a theme of candaulism, that was very rare at the time. It was filmed in 1971 by director Pasquale Festa Campanile, and starred Laura Antonelli and Lando Buzzanca.

Synopsis
Niccolò Vivaldi (Lando Buzzanca) is a frustrated cello player whose career has stalled and who is unappreciated by his orchestra director.

He discovers that the beauty of his wife, Costanza (Laura Antonelli), arouses in him admiration for her, and reflects on him. From then on, he decides to show it in public in order to gain personal glory. He takes photographs of her in poses that gradually became pornographic, and he begins to show the images to his friend and colleague Cavalmoretti (Lino Toffolo) and in a moment of madness to all the other members of the orchestra. Eventually, in a crescendo of exhibitionism, she playfully encourages him to photograph her nude in sensual poses, such as the screenshot below, and finally he exposes her completely nude (by an apparent accident with her dress) in front of everyone at Verona's Arena during the showing of Aida.

Cast 

Laura Antonelli: Costanza Vivaldi
Lando Buzzanca: Niccolò Vivaldi
Gianrico Tedeschi: Orchestra conductor
Lino Toffolo: Cavalmoretti 
Luciano Bianciardi: Mazzacurati
Gino Cavalieri: Costanza's father
Elsa Vazzoler: Costanza's mother
Ferruccio De Ceresa: Psychoanalyst
Aldo Puglisi: Pharmacist
Pietro Tordi: Doctor

Comment 
This motion picture was filmed in Verona, and it shows many situations in the environment of practicing symphonic orchestras that at certain moment of the year are allowed to play in Arena. Il Merlo Maschio represents the Commedia all'italiana.

Unlike most Italian comedy films in that epoch, always repeating the storyboards of the first erotic dreams of the symbolic teenager Pierino, or the arousal reactions of secluded soldiers that watch for the first time the shapes of a beauty queen (Gloria Guida, etc.), The Male Blackbird is also a light and discrete sociological presentation of the theme of candaulism, something very frequent today (husbands that buy transparent panties and bras for their wives) but that was very rare at those times: the apparently casual, but carefully planned exposing of the spouse by her husband (Candaulism is classified by psychiatrist as a mania or paraphilia).

External links 
 

1971 films
Erotic fantasy films
1970s sex comedy films
1970s Italian-language films
Commedia all'italiana
Films directed by Pasquale Festa Campanile
Commedia sexy all'italiana
Films scored by Riz Ortolani
1971 comedy films
1970s Italian films